Stephen de Gravesend may refer to:

 Stephen Gravesend, bishop
Stephen de Gravesend (MP) for Middlesex (UK Parliament constituency)